UCMSA Universalis is a multicultural and multidisciplinary student association directly affiliated with the University College Maastricht. It is run by UCM students for UCM students and contributes to both academic and social life at UCM. The association is involved in the organisation of debates, poetry readings, open-mic nights, parties, charity fundraisers, student representation, and other events. Following a structure typical of Maastricht University study associations, it is run by a student board. The Universalis student board consists of an Executive Board, a Social Board, an Academic Board, and an Independent Body. Board positions are traditionally a semester to two semesters long. Active members of the association are organised as committees which provide services for all students at the college. All new students automatically become a member upon enrollment at the college.

Organisation structure 
All positions are democratically elected in a General Assembly of Universalis members with elections organized by the Independent Body in coordination with the outgoing board.

The Executive Board manages the administration of the association via the President, Secretary, and Treasurer. They comprise the legal board of the statutes and are kvk-registered officers of the association. The Executive Board handles the financial, administrative, and long term strategy duties for the association as a whole whilst facilitating the Social and Academic Boards in Semesterly planning. 

There are currently four members on the Social Board: Social Chair, Social Acquisitions Executive, Social Internal Executive, and Social External Executive. Board members serve for one or two semesters after which they can re-apply.  Social Board meetings are held once a week.  Universalis's committees and societies operate under the Social Board, who seek to financially and logistically facilitate all committee activities.

The Academic Board works in parallel with the Social Board, with four members: Academic Chair, Academic Events Coordinator, Academic Internal Executive and Academic External Executive. The Academic Board represents students in working with the University College Maastricht's Board of Studies, who are responsible for evaluating academic courses and affairs. They also organize Academic conferences, guest speakers, academic workshops, and student exchanges with sister colleges. The Academic Board is also supported by a Faculty Council.

The Independent Body consists of three to five students elected by a general assembly with the goal of keeping the Social Board and Academic Council in accordance with the association's Statutes and Policy Manual. They also serve a functional role in General Assemblies and voting procedures.

Current Committees and Societies 

Archeion - History Committee

Arts&Photos Committee

Book Club

Charity Committee

DanceVersity - Dance Committee

EduSoc

ExCo

Film Committee

GECCO - Sustainability Committee

Hypatia - Feminist Committee

Latin American Perspectives

Ludens - Games Committee

Meditation Committee

Music Committee

Musical Theatre Committee

Party Committee

PINE - Pluralism in Economics

Spiritual Enlightenment

Sports Committee

STEM - Science, Technology, Engineering and Maths

Theatre Committee

The Bell - UCM magazine/paper

Wellbeing Committee

History 

At the beginning of September 2002 UCM's first students gathered in the back yard of the newly founded college. Several students formed an informal founding committee to get a student society started. Because the diversity of UCM's students and its curriculum, they decided  that Da Vinci's Homo Universalis was a suitable symbol for the student society's identity. It represents the juxtaposition of different interests in its members and of the diverse UCM student body. The founding committee decided to call the association Universalis and Brian Pagán designed the logo, a stylised version of the Vitruvian Man. The first unofficial Universalis general meeting was held on 19 September 2002. The organisation's structure was drawn up by the founding committee and the first board was elected. The organisation was registered with the Maastricht Chamber of Commerce and certified by a notary on 3 December 2002, marking the official establishment of UCM Study Association Universalis.

UCMSA Universalis joined University College Student Representatives of the Netherlands (UCSRN) in 2014 and has been an active member since.

The UCMSA Universalis Statutes and Policy Manual have undergone multiple revisions over the past two decades and the most up-to-date editions can be found on the association's website.

References

External links

Luminous, UCM alumni
University College Maastricht
Maastricht University

2002 establishments in the Netherlands
Liberal arts colleges
Maastricht University
Universities in the Netherlands